Events in the year 1990 in Portugal.

Incumbents
President: Mário Soares
Prime Minister: Aníbal Cavaco Silva

Events
Establishment of the National Solidarity Party.

Arts and entertainment
Portugal participated in the Eurovision Song Contest 1990, with Nucha and the song "Há sempre alguém".

Sport
In association football, for the first-tier league seasons, see 1989–90 Primeira Divisão and 1990–91 Primeira Divisão; for the Taça de Portugal seasons, see 1989–90 Taça de Portugal and 1990–91 Taça de Portugal. 
 27 May and 3 June - Taça de Portugal Final

References

 
Portugal
Portugal
Years of the 20th century in Portugal